Ánde Somby, born in Buolbmat, Norway, is a traditional Sami joik artist and an associate professor at the Faculty of Law at the University of Tromsø, specializing in Indigenous Rights Law.

Somby has been active yoiker since 1974. He has also been producing records with other yoikers. In 1985 he produced the LP record and MC cassette "Ean Máššan" with his father  Aslak Somby (1913–2008) and mother Karen Kristine Porsanger Somby born 1920. in 1991 he produced the record Ravddas Ravdii with Inga Juuso. In 2000 he produced the record "Deh" and in 2003 Deh2 with his uncle Ivvár Niillas.
Somby is only one of few Sami with Ph.D. in law (dr. juris). Somby's Ph.D. is titled "Juss som retorikk". In that thesis he reconnected the Nordic jurisprudence to the classical rhetorical tradition which dates back to Plato and Aristotle. In 2009, Somby was working on a project titled "Is the legal medium the legal message?", in which he attempted to apply Marshall McLuhans mantra on the medium being the message to jurisprudence.

Somby is also one of the cofounders of the Sámi publishing house and record label Dat. Together with the band Boknakaran from Tromsø and the acapella group Rosynka from Petrozavodsk in Russia Somby  participated in the project "moya på Tvoja" (1998–2002). From 2003 to 2007 Somby was a member of the group Vajas (in English it means echo) and was the vocals and yoiker for the band.

See also 
 Somby (surname)
 Yoiking with the Winged Ones

References

External links 
 Ánde Somby's Sami Joik website
 

Norwegian Sámi people
Norwegian Sámi-language writers
Norwegian Sámi musicians
Living people
1958 births
Norwegian Sámi academics